Jonquil Panting (born 26 February 1966) is a British radio director, notable for her work for BBC Radio 4, such as Witness: Five Plays from the Gospel of Luke (2007) and I, Claudius (2010).

Radio Plays
A dozen radio productions (2005-2021) are listed at https://www.comedy.co.uk/people/jonquil_panting/.

References

Living people
BBC Radio drama directors
British radio directors
Women radio directors
1966 births